Nastassja Isabella Bolívar Cifuentes (born October 24, 1988, in Miami) is a Nicaraguan-American actress, TV host and beauty queen who won Nuestra Belleza Latina 2011 and was crowned Miss Nicaragua 2013 and represented Nicaragua at Miss Universe 2013.

Early life
Nastassja Bolivar speaks English, French and Spanish. When she auditioned for Nuestra Belleza Latina 2011 she was studying fashion merchandising at Miami International University of Art and Design. However, with the possibility of appearing in many programs for a year when Univision offered the contract, she decided to venture into television production .

Pageantry

Nuestra Belleza Latina 2011
On May 22, 2011, Nastassja Bolivar from Nicaragua won the beauty pageant/reality show Nuestra Belleza Latina 2011 on Univision. After 12 weeks of competition, Nastassja won $250,000 in cash and prizes and a one-year contract with the Univision Network. She is the first (and so far only) winner who was born and raised in the continental United States.

Miss Nicaragua 2013
Nastassja Bolivar was crowned Miss Nicaragua 2013 at the 31st edition of Miss Nicaragua beauty contest. Farah Eslaquit (Miss Nicaragua 2012 winner) crowned Miss Nicaragua 2013 at the beauty contest that took place at the Ruben Dario National Theater on Saturday night of March 2, 2013. She was selected as Miss Universe Nicaragua 2013 and an official representative of Nicaragua at the 62nd edition of Miss Universe beauty contest.

Miss Universe 2013

Bolivar represented Nicaragua at the Miss Universe 2013 pageant on November 9, 2013, in Moscow, Russia where she became the third Nicaraguan woman to place, eventually finishing in the Top 16. During the preliminary competition Nastassja won Best National Costume and was awarded a $5,000 Credit Card from Russian Standard Bank.

After the contest, Bolívar had her crown taken away by director of the franchise, Karen Celebertti, for insubordination.

References

External links
Official Miss Nicaragua website

1988 births
Living people
Miss Universe 2013 contestants
American people of Nicaraguan descent
Nicaraguan beauty pageant winners
Nuestra Belleza Latina winners